Serghei Spivac (born January 24, 1995), also known as Sergey Spivak, is a Moldovan mixed martial artist who competes in the Heavyweight division of the Ultimate Fighting Championship. A professional competitor since 2014, he has also formerly competed for World Warriors Fighting Championships, Eagles Fighting Championship, N1 Pro Nomad MMA and Real Fight Promotion. As of March 13, 2023, he is #8 in the UFC heavyweight rankings.

Mixed martial arts career

Early career
Serghei Spivac made his MMA debut in September 2014 with the Ukrainian promotion Real Fight Promotion, at 19 years old. He faced Andrey Serebrianikov as his first opponent. He won the fight in the last minute of the first round, by way of TKO.

His second fight was with the Ukrainian-based World Warriors Fighting Championships, at WWFC Ukraine Selection 1, where he faced  Evgeniy Bova in the main event. Spivac won the fight in the first round by way of a kimura.

His second fight with World Warriors Fighting Championships was during WWFC: Ukraine Selection 4, in the main event. His opponent was  Yuri Gorbenko, whom he defeated in the first round through an armbar.

Spivac would than fight against Dimitriy Mikutsa, under the N1 Pro organization. Spivac submitted Mikutsa through an armbar during the last minute of the second round.

Under the banner of Eagles Fighting Championship, Spivac faced Artem Cherkov. Spivac would beat him in the first round, by way of a head kick.

After a year-long layoff, Spivac would return to the World Warriors Fighting Championships. His first opponent was Luke Morton, whom he beat by KO. In his next fight Spivac fought against the MMA veteran Travis Fulton for the vacant WWFC Heavyweight Championship, a fight which he won in the first round by a rear naked choke. He would defend the title 10 months later against the Croatian fighter Ivo Cuk, winning the bout in the first round by TKO. His last fight with WWFC was his last title defense, five months after his fight with Cuk, against Tony Lopez. He defeated Lopez by a neck crank  in the last minute of the first round.

Ultimate Fighting Championship
Spivac made his UFC debut during UFC Fight Night 151, at 23 years old, against Walt Harris, replacing Alexey Oleynik.  He suffered the first professional loss of his career. Harris pushed Serghei up to the cage, dazed him with a left straight and dropped him to the floor with a barrage of knees. After a series of grounded strikes, the referee awarded Harris a win, after 50 seconds, by way of TKO.

Five months later, Spivac fought against Tai Tuivasa at UFC 243. Spivac would begin the fight being cautious of Tuivasa's power. Spivac was dropped once in the first round by a leg kick. Spivac then began catching Tuivasa's leg kicks and would take the Australian down. Whenever the Australian would return to his feet, Spivac would pursue takedowns. The fight ended in the fourth minute of the second round, Spivac took Tuivasa down for the 7th time in the fight. He was able to obtain the mount and after several hard punches and elbows he was able to obtain an arm triangle choke, awarding him his first UFC win.

Spivac faced Marcin Tybura on February 29, 2020, at UFC Fight Night 169. He lost the fight via unanimous decision.

Spivac was expected to face Carlos Felipe on May 9, 2020, at then UFC 250. However, on April 9, Dana White, the president of UFC announced that this event was postponed to a future date Eventually the bout was scheduled on July 19, 2020, at UFC Fight Night 172. He won the fight via majority decision.

Spivac was expected to face Tom Aspinall on  October 11, 2020 at UFC Fight Night 179. However Spivac withdrew from the bout for undisclosed reason and he was replaced by promotional newcomer Alan Baudot.

Spivac was scheduled to face Jared Vanderaa on December 12, 2020, at UFC 256 However, Vanderaa tested positive for COVID-19 during fight week and had to be pulled. The pair eventually met on February 20, 2021, at UFC Fight Night 185. Spivac won the fight via technical knockout in round two.

Spivac faced Alexey Oleynik on June 19, 2021, at UFC on ESPN 25. He won the bout via unanimous decision.

Spivac faced Tom Aspinall, replacing Sergei Pavlovich, on September 4, 2021, at UFC Fight Night 191. He lost the fight via technical knockout in round one.

Spivac was scheduled to face  Greg Hardy, replacing Aleksei Oleinik, on January 22, 2022, at UFC 270.  However, just a week before the event Hardy withdrew due to a finger injury and the bout was removed from the event. The pair was moved to UFC 272. Spivac won the fight via technical knockout in round one.

Spivac faced Augusto Sakai on August 6, 2022 at UFC on ESPN 40. He won the fight via technical knockout in round two.

Spivac was expected to face Derrick Lewis in the main event of UFC Fight Night 215 on November 19, 2022. However, Lewis was forced to pull out of the event due to non-COVID, non-weight cutting illness and the bout was cancelled. The pair was rescheduled for UFC Fight Night 218 on February 4, 2023. Spivac won the fight via an arm-triangle choke in round one. This win earned Spivac his first Performance of the Night bonus award.

Personal life
Spivac and his wife have a daughter who was born in 2020.

Championships and accomplishments

Mixed martial arts
Ultimate Fighting Championship
Performance of the Night (One time) 
World Warriors Fighting Championship
WWFC Heavyweight Championship (One time)
Two successful title defenses

Mixed martial arts record

|-
|Win
| style="text-align:center" | 16–3
|Derrick Lewis
|Submission (arm-triangle choke)
|UFC Fight Night: Lewis vs. Spivak
|
|align=center|1
|align=center|3:05
|Las Vegas, Nevada, United States
|
|-
|Win
| style="text-align:center" | 15–3
|Augusto Sakai
|TKO (punches)
|UFC on ESPN: Santos vs. Hill
|
| style="text-align:center" | 2
| style="text-align:center" | 3:42
|Las Vegas, Nevada, United States
|
|-
|Win
| style="text-align:center" | 14–3
|Greg Hardy
|TKO (punches)
|UFC 272
|
| style="text-align:center" | 1
| style="text-align:center" | 2:16
|Las Vegas, Nevada, United States
|
|-
|Loss
| style="text-align:center" | 13–3
|Tom Aspinall
|TKO (elbow and punches)
|UFC Fight Night: Brunson vs. Till 
|
| style="text-align:center" | 1
| style="text-align:center" | 2:30
|Las Vegas, Nevada, United States
|
|-
|Win
| style="text-align:center" | 13–2
|Alexey Oleynik
|Decision (unanimous)
|UFC on ESPN: The Korean Zombie vs. Ige 
|
| style="text-align:center" | 3
| style="text-align:center" | 5:00
|Las Vegas, Nevada, United States
|
|-
|Win
| style="text-align:center" | 12–2
|Jared Vanderaa
|TKO (punches)
|UFC Fight Night: Blaydes vs. Lewis
|
| style="text-align:center" | 2
| style="text-align:center" | 4:32
|Las Vegas, Nevada, United States
|
|-
|Win
| style="text-align:center" | 11–2
|Carlos Felipe
|Decision (majority)
|UFC Fight Night: Figueiredo vs. Benavidez 2 
|
| style="text-align:center" | 3
| style="text-align:center" | 5:00
|Abu Dhabi, United Arab Emirates
|
|-
|Loss
| style="text-align:center" | 10–2
|Marcin Tybura
|Decision (unanimous)
|UFC Fight Night: Benavidez vs. Figueiredo 
|
| style="text-align:center" | 3
| style="text-align:center" | 5:00
|Norfolk, Virginia, United States
|
|-
|Win
| style="text-align:center" | 10–1
|Tai Tuivasa
| Technical Submission (arm-triangle choke)
|UFC 243
|
| style="text-align:center" | 2
| style="text-align:center" | 3:14
|Melbourne, Australia
|
|-
|Loss
| style="text-align:center" | 9–1
|Walt Harris
|TKO (punches)
|UFC Fight Night: Iaquinta vs. Cowboy
|
| style="text-align:center" | 1
| style="text-align:center" | 0:50
|Ottawa, Ontario, Canada
|
|-
|Win
| style="text-align:center" | 9–0
|Tony Lopez
|Submission (neck crank)
|WWFC 12
|
| style="text-align:center" | 1
| style="text-align:center" | 4:12
|Kyiv, Ukraine
|
|-
|Win
| style="text-align:center" | 8–0
|Ivo Cuk
|TKO (punches)
|WWFC 10
|
| style="text-align:center" | 1
| style="text-align:center" | 2:21
|Kyiv, Ukraine
|
|-
|Win
| style="text-align:center" | 7–0
|Travis Fulton
|Submission (rear-naked choke)
|WWFC: Cage Encounter 7
|
| style="text-align:center" | 1
| style="text-align:center" | 2:50
|Kyiv, Ukraine
|
|-
|Win
| style="text-align:center" | 6–0
|Luke Morton
|KO (punches)
|WWFC: Cage Encounter 6
|
| style="text-align:center" | 1
| style="text-align:center" | 0:40
|Kyiv, Ukraine
|
|-
|Win
| style="text-align:center" | 5–0
|Artem Cherkov
|KO (head kick)
|Eagles Fighting Championship
|
| style="text-align:center" | 1
| style="text-align:center" | 1:52
|Chișinău, Moldova
|
|-
|Win
| style="text-align:center" | 4–0
|Dimitriy Mikutsa
|Submission (armbar)
|N1 Pro: MMA Nomad
|
| style="text-align:center" | 2
| style="text-align:center" | 4:34
|Karaganda, Kazakhstan 
|
|-
|Win
| style="text-align:center" | 3–0
|Yuri Gorbenko
|Submission (armbar)
|WWFC: Ukraine Selection 4
|
| style="text-align:center" | 1
| style="text-align:center" | 3:38
|Kyiv, Ukraine
|
|-
|Win
| style="text-align:center" | 2–0
|Evgeniy Bova
|Submission (kimura)
|WWFC: Ukraine Selection 1
|
| style="text-align:center" | 1
| style="text-align:center" | N/A
|Lviv, Ukraine
|
|-
|Win
| style="text-align:center" | 1–0
|Andrey Serebrianikov
|TKO (punches)
|RFP: Galychyny Cup
|
| style="text-align:center" | 1
| style="text-align:center" | 4:31
|Lviv, Ukraine
|
|-

See also
List of current UFC fighters
List of male mixed martial artists

References

External links
 
 

1995 births
Living people
Sportspeople from Chișinău
Moldovan male mixed martial artists
Moldovan sambo practitioners
Ultimate Fighting Championship male fighters
Heavyweight mixed martial artists
Ukrainian male mixed martial artists
Ukrainian sambo practitioners
Mixed martial artists utilizing sambo